Kaniyarkode  is a village in Thrissur district in the state of Kerala, India.

Demographics
 India census, Kaniyarkode had a population of 12,633 with 6,114 males and 6,519 females.

References

Villages in Thrissur district